Heracles Patroos ( ancestor) is the divine epithet of Heracles in ancient Macedonia. A throne in Vergina palace, probably religious in function, is dedicated to Heracles Patroos  . Patroos is also an epithet of Apollo and Zeus in other regions of ancient Greece.

See also
Caranus (king)
Antigonus (son of Callas)
Temple of Apollo Patroos

References

LSJ: patrôios
Encyclopedia of ancient Greece By Nigel Guy Wilson Page 84 
Die politische Rolle der Heraklesgestalt im griechischen Herrschertum pag. 71 by Ulrich Huttner  .
Polytheism and society at Athens By Robert Parker page 22 	

Epithets of Heracles
Religion in ancient Macedonia